Captain William Robinson Lampee (February 14, 1826February 21, 1892) was a 19th-century Boston maritime pilot. He was one of the oldest and most experienced pilots in the Boston service. He was a Boston pilot for forty years. He had ownership in the Boston pilot boat Friend.

Early life

Captain William "Bill" Lampee was born in Philadelphia, Pennsylvania on February 14, 1826. His parents were Martin E Lampe and Mary C Haverstick. In 1835, he moved with his parents to Boston where and was educated at the Boston schools. In 1842, Lampee went to sea on the ship Amitonae and went around Cape Horn and stayed in the Pacific for four years. Lampee married Elizabeth Newton Davis on July 3, 1850 and had two children.

Lampee's son, Charles Walter Lampee would later marry Thomas Cooper's daughter, Agnes Isabelle Cooper. Charles W. Lampee and Agnes Cooper had two boys, Charles Irving Lampee and Thomas Cooper Lampee. Charles I. Lampee wrote about his summer vacations and boyhood experiences on the pilot boat Friend, sixty years later in an article called Memories of Cruises on Boston Pilot Boats of Long Ago. Since both of his grandfathers were Boston pilots, he was able to listen to their conversations of pilot boats and life of the sea. Captain Thomas Cooper paid special attention to his grandson Charles I. Lampee and took him on summer cruises in the 1890s.

In 1877, Lampee's son, Charles "Charley" W. Lampee went into business with Thomas F. McManus, who was a fish merchant. They opened a wholesale and retail fish market named, Lampee, McManus & Co. The name changed to McManus & Co., when Lampee left the business in 1879.

An oil painting of the pilot boat Eben D. Jordan, No. 2, by Hendricks A. Hallett  of Boston, was owned by Lampee's grandson, Charles I. Lampee of Winchester, Massachusetts. The boat was built in 1883 and named in honor of Boston merchant Eben D. Jordan, the founder of the Jordan Marsh department stores. Lampee's grandfather, Captain Thomas Cooper, built the boat and was a friend of Mr. Jordan.

Career

Lampee started his career in 1848 on the pilot boat Anoyma as a boat-keeper. On October 1867, he offered his services to pilot the brig America. The captain refused to employ him. Since the vessel was required by the laws of Massachusetts to pay the pilotage fee, a lien was placed on the ship and master. The pilot of the America said that the court has no jurisdiction to enforce the lien. The District Court decided that the lien gave the right to proceed against the vessel.

Lampee received his full commission as a branch pilot for the port of Boston in 1869. He was one of the oldest and most experienced pilots in the Boston service. He was a pilot for forty years.

Daniel Webster 
Lampee was a pilot on the Boston pilot-boat Daniel Webster, which was built in 1851 at Chelsea, Massachusetts. Captain Thomas Cooper was a boat-keeper apprentice and later received his commission as a pilot. When Mr. Webster died on 1852, the pilots of the Daniel Webster, wanted to attend his funeral. However, when they sailed to Marshfield, Massachusetts, they could not come ashore because there was not enough wind to pilot the boat close enough to the shore. The Webster left for San Francisco in February 1853 to serve as a pilot boat there.

An oil painting of the pilot boat Webster, was owned by Lampee's grandson Charles I Lampee.

Friend 

Captain Lampee was part owner and captain of pilot-boat Friend, No. 7, which was built at the Dennison J. Lawlor's shipyard in East Boston in early 1887. On January 12, 1888, Lampee was the ship commander during the trial trip of the Friend.

Lampee's grandson, Charles I. Lampee, wrote about sailing on the Friend 150 miles from the Boston Light in dense fog. They were expecting to board the Warren Line Virginian. When she approached, they sent up a blue and white pilot flag and fired a signal gun to get the ships attention. A pilot was able to board the Virginian, despite the fog and a close encounter with the vessel.

Death

Lampee died a widower on February 21, 1892, at age 66, in Chelsea, Massachusetts. His funeral took place at his late residence in Chelsea. Rev. P. Jefferson officiated. Members of the Boston Marine Society and the Boston Pilots' Association were present. He was buried at the Forest Hills Cemetery, in Boston, Massachusetts.  When Lampee died in 1892, Thomas Cooper continued as the grandfather to the Lampee's grandchildren taking them out in his pilot boats.

See also
 List of Northeastern U. S. Pilot Boats

References

People from Boston
1833 births
1906 deaths
Maritime pilotage
Sea captains